The Furka Steam Railway is a largely volunteer-operated heritage railway which operates a partially rack and pinion-operated line across the Furka Pass, between Realp in Uri and Oberwald in Valais. It has been gradually brought back into service by the Verein Furka-Bergstrecke with the use of only steam locomotives, with the entire line completed in 2010. As a result, the nearly 18 kilometre-long Furka Railway is the longest operated unelectrified line in Switzerland. It is also the second highest rail crossing in Europe, after the Bernina Railway. The Uri side of the line also constitutes the highest railway in Central Switzerland.

The section of line was always a severe operational difficulty for the FO as its high altitude rendered it impassable due to snow and ice for much of the winter season, hence its being abandoned and a tunnel constructed. This has remained a headache for the DFB, as every year it must be closed down and then reopened, an expensive process which involves the removal and replacement of a specially folding transportable bridge that would otherwise be damaged by the snow every year.

The rebuilding of the line has also not been without new difficulties. Requiring to cross a busy main road on a rack operated section, the rack over the road is retractable, actuated to raise at the same time as the level crossing barriers by radios fitted to the line's locomotives. Another section, running through a forested nature reserve, has had to be fitted with a sprinkler system that operates before and after trains pass, again actuated by the radios aboard. Relays allow the system to cascade up or down the section in line with the train, to save water which is supplied by natural water supplies near the summit of the line.

Current and future plans 

The organisation is currently  restoring 2 HG 4/4 "D" Steam Locomotives. These 0-8-0 locos were built in Switzerland for use in Vietnam, and were repatriated along with locomotives from the Furka Oberalp Bahn that had been exported to Vietnam after their use in Switzerland.  The organisation is currently endeavouring to raise approximately  Swiss Fr. 1,700,000, or  1,200,000 Euro or  1,200,000 US Dollars for the work required.  The test runs of one of the locomotives are planned for 2013, to assess their suitability for the Furka line. The cost of a new firebox, one of the components the HG 4/4s require, is about Swiss Fr. 110,000, or 80,000 Euro.

Another current project is the restoration of a steam-powered rotary snowplough to deal with the heavy snowfall that needs to be cleared from the route before services can commence each year. This may provide a lucrative opportunity as photographers and film-makers from across Europe and the world will be keen to capture such clearances on camera.

The fundraising foundation Stiftung Furka - Bergstrecke (Furka Mountain Line Foundation), which is separate to the operating company, is providing for the reconstruction of the 2 HG 4/4 locomotives and to develop the line's depot at Realp. The foundation provides investment for equipment and construction on the line generally.

There are videos on YouTube of the line running, with the snowplough.

See also
List of heritage railways and funiculars in Switzerland
List of mountain railways in Switzerland

References

External links

 Official Website 

Heritage railways in Switzerland
Metre gauge railways in Switzerland
Mountain railways
Rack railways in Switzerland
Railway lines in Switzerland
Tourist attractions in Switzerland
Railway lines opened in 1925